Canberra International Sports and Aquatic Centre (CISAC) is located in Bruce and is a privately owned sport centre. CISAC is home to the CISAC swim academy and the Ginninderra Marlins swimming club.

CISAC is one of the largest multi-tenancy health and leisure facilities in Australia. Located onsite are two health clubs, aquatic facilities, a Day Spa, medical services, scuba diving training, child care, discount health and fitness supplies, a hair salon, and cafe.

About CISAC
Over 1,000,000 people annually visit CISAC and over 7,000 call it home to their health and fitness, swimming and learn to swim membership. CISAC is home to the Ginninderra Swim Club, with over 100 people training there daily during mornings and during the evenings.

Safety improvements were made at the pool complex after a two-year-old boy drowned in 2005. Later in March 2022 CISAC recorded a death of a two-year-old girl after visiting a swimming pool. The death was not considered suspicious.

References

External links
 

Sports venues in Canberra
Swimming venues in Australia
2004 establishments in Australia
Sports venues completed in 2004
Sports complexes in Australia